Novara is the capital city of the province of Novara in the Piedmont region in northwest Italy, to the west of Milan. With 101,916 inhabitants (on 1 January 2021), it is the second most populous city in Piedmont after Turin. It is an important crossroads for commercial traffic along the routes from Milan to Turin and from Genoa to Switzerland.

History

Novara was founded  around 89 BC by the Romans, when the local Gauls obtained the Roman citizenship. Its name is formed from Nov, meaning "new", and Aria, the name the Cisalpine Gauls used for the surrounding region.

Ancient Novaria, which dates to the time of the Ligures and the Celts, was a municipium and was situated on the road from Vercellae (Vercelli) to (Mediolanum) Milan. Its position on perpendicular roads (still intact today) dates to the time of the Romans. After the city was destroyed in 386 by Magnus Maximus for having supported his rival Valentinian II, it was rebuilt by Theodosius I. Subsequently, it was sacked by Radagaisus (in 405) and Attila (in 452).

Under the Lombards, Novara became a duchy; under Charles the Fat, a countship. Novara came to enjoy the rights of a free imperial city. In 1110, it was conquered by Henry V and destroyed, but in 1167 it joined the Lombard League. At the end of the 12th century, it accepted the protection of Milan and became practically a dominion of the Visconti and later of the Sforza. In the Battle of Novara in 1513, Swiss mercenaries defending Novara for the Sforzas of Milan routed the French troops besieging the city. This defeat ended the French invasion of Italy in the War of the League of Cambrai.

In 1706, Novara, which had long ago been promised by Filippo Maria Visconti to Amadeus VIII of Savoy, was occupied by Savoyard troops. With the Peace of Utrecht, the city, together with Milan, became part of the Habsburg Empire. After its occupation in 1734, Novara passed, in the following year, to the House of Savoy.

After Napoleon's campaign in Italy, Novara became the capital of the Department of the Agogna, but was then reassigned to the House of Savoy in 1814. In 1821, it was the site of a battle in which regular Sardinian troops defeated the Piedmontese constitutional liberals. In the even larger Battle of Novara in 1849, the Sardinian army was defeated by the Austrian army of Field Marshal Joseph Radetzky von Radetz. This defeat led to the abdication of Charles Albert of Sardinia and to the partial occupation of the city by the Austrians. The defeat of the Sardinians can be seen as the beginning of the Italian unification movement.

A decree in 1859 created the province of Novara, which then included the present-day provinces of Vercelli, Biella, and Verbano-Cusio-Ossola.

The city of Novara had a population of 25,144 in 1861. Industrialisation during the 20th century brought an increase in the city's population to 102,088 in 1981. The city's population has changed little in subsequent years.

Oscar Luigi Scalfaro, former president of Italy and Italian senator for life, was born in Novara in 1918.

Climate

Architecture

Novara's sights can be divided into two groupings. The city's most important sights lie within its historic centre, the area once enclosed by the city walls. However, several important sights also lie outside the line of the former city walls.

Novara has numerous churches and historic buildings; some of these have been restored over the years. The most significant architectural element is th emajestic dome, 121 meters high, designed by the architect-engineer Alessandro Antonelli. 
Now known as the Basilica of San Gaudenzio,it was built in 1888. It has nowbecome a symbol of the city and a distinctive sign of its panorama, observable from all the road that lead to the city.
The bell tower is also of particular interest; it was designed by Benedetto Alfieri, uncle of the more famous Vittorio Alfieri.

Historic centre

The old urban core makes up the "Historic centre", situated in the district of the same name. Novara once had an encircling wall, which was demolished to permit urban development. Of the old wall there remains only the Barriera Albertina, a complex of two neo-classical buildings that constituted the gate of entry to the city, the required passageway for those who traveled from Turin to Milan. After their removal, the walls were replaced by the present-day baluardi, the broad, tree-lined boulevards that surround the Historic Centre.

The centre of the religious life of the city is the Novara Cathedral, in the neo-classical style, also designed by Alessandro Antonelli. It rises exactly where the temple of Jupiter stood in the time of the Romans. Facing the Duomo is the oldest building in Novara today: the early Christian Battistero (Baptistry).

Close to the Duomo is the courtyard of the Broletto (the historic meeting place of the city council), the centre of the political life of the imperial free city of Novara. Overlooking the courtyard of the Broletto are the Palazzo del Podestà ("Palace of the Podestà"), Palazzetto dei Paratici ("Little Palace of the Paratici Family"), site of the Civic Museum and of the Gallery of Modern Art, the Palace of the City Council, and a building of the 15th century.

Not far from the Piazza della Repubblica (formerly Piazza Duomo) is the Piazza Cesare Battisti (known to Novaresi as the Piazza delle Erbe, "Herbs square"), which constitutes the exact centre of the city of Novara.

In Piazza Giacomo Matteotti stands the Palazzo Natta-Isola, seat of the province and of the prefecture of Novara. The landmark feature of this palace is its clock tower. Extending from this square is the via Fratelli Rosselli, along which is the Palazzo Cabrino, the official seat of the administrative offices of the city. As it was a Roman city, the street network of Novara is characterized by a cardo and a Decumanus Maximus, which correspond respectively to the present-day Corso Cavour and Corso Italia. The two streets cross at the so-called "Angolo delle Ore" (Corner of the Hours).

The city conservatory, Conservatorio Guido Cantelli, named after Novara's Guido Cantelli, is located in via Collegio Gallarini, 1 (facing largo Luigi Sante Colonna in the area between piazza Puccini and Novara's hospital). The conservatory, founded in 1996, was established in a building built in the 1700s, once known as the casone. In 1766, the building, after a donation from the Gallarini family, started to be used as a college. Between 1854 and 1905, several artistic features, such as colored tiles and terracotta decorations on the facade were added.

The largest square is Piazza Martiri della Libertà (formerly Piazza Castello) dominated by the equestrian statue of Victor Emmanuel II, the first king of Italy.  Overlooking the Piazza Martiri are the Castello Visconteo-Sforzesco, built by the Milanese dukes Visconti and Sforza, and the Teatro Coccia. The Castello Visconteo-Sforzesco, once much larger than the complex that remains today, is surrounded by the Allea, one of the largest public gardens in Novara.

Other important squares are:

 Largo Cavour, dominated by the statue of Cavour, recently restored.
 Piazza Garibaldi, the square facing the Novara Railway Station, also recently restored and featuring the statue of the hero of two worlds and a fountain with the statue of a mondina.
 Piazza Gramsci, formerly Piazza del Rosario, location, after the restoration of 2005, of the landmark statue of Icarus.

Outside the Baluardi

Places of interest situated outside the belt of the baluardi include the Church of San Nazzaro della Costa, with its attached abbey, restored in the 15th century by Bernardino of Siena, and the Ossuary of Bicocca, in pyramidal form, which stands in the neighbourhood of Bicocca, in memory of the fallen soldiers of the historic battle of 23 March 1849, between the Piedmontese (Sardinia) and Austrians. Worthy of note are the Church of Santa Maria delle Grazie (Saints Martino and Gaudenzio), built beginning in 1477 by the Augustinians, whose interior consists of a single nave with lateral chapels and paintings attributed to artists of the 15th century, among them Daniele de Bosis.

Religious buildings

 Chiesa di Ognissanti (12th century)
 Santa Maria delle Grazie, also known as San Martino (15th century)
 San Pietro al Rosario (1599-1618)
 San Marco (17th century)
 Oratory of San Giovanni Decollato (17th century)
 Santa Maria della Salute (17th century)
 Sant'Eufemia (17th century)
 Chiesa del Carmine  (18th to 19th centuries)
 Nuova Chiesa di San Rocco (21st century)

Festivals and events
 22 January: Novara celebrates annually the Feast of San Gaudenzio (Saint Gaudentius of Novara), the patron saint of Novara. Throughout the day, it is possible to visit the tomb of the saint and to obtain the typical roasted chestnuts, also known as marroni di Cuneo (" Cuneo chestnuts").
 23 March: Re-enactment of the 1849 Battle of Novara, with period uniforms and weapons.
 On 25 April, Liberation Day, as in many other Italian cities, the Novaresi organise numerous initiatives to commemorate the Italian resistance movement, and in particular, the partisans who fought around Novara and in the "Partisan Republic of the Ossola".
 Since 2001, Giovani Espressioni ("Young Expressions") has been held in Novara.  This is a musical festival for emerging young musicians, organised by Staff Millennium, a performance agency, of which Alessandro Marchetti is the artistic director. The "Espressioni Contest" is of special importance as a showcase for emerging bands that picks a winner every year. Among the noted artists who have participated are Negramaro, Caparezza, Finley, Vallanzaska, Extrema, and Blaze Bailey.
 Since 2005, Novara hosts the "Novara Gospel Festival", that is composed by workshops, local tours, and obviously gospel concerts in the main theatre of the city. It is probably one of the most important festival of this music in Italy, also because the main event is a concert of the most appreciated gospel's singers, such as Kirk Franklin, Donnie Mc Clurkin, etc.

Demographics

In 2007, there were 102,862 people residing in Novara, of whom 49% were male and 51% were female. Minors (children ages 18 and younger) totalled 16.35% of the population compared to pensioners who number 21.6%. This compares with the Italian average of 18.06% (minors) and 19.94% (pensioners). The average age of Novara residents is 44 compared to the Italian average of 42. In the five years between 2002 and 2007, the population of Novara grew by 1.64%, while Italy as a whole grew by 3.85%. The birth rate in Novara is 9.15 births per 1,000 inhabitants compared to the Italian average of 9.45 births.

In 2006, 92.37% of the population was Italian. The largest immigrant group comes from other European nations: 2.94%, North Africa: 2.23%, and Latin America: 0.71%. Like most of Italy, Novara is predominantly Roman Catholic.

Economy

Novara is an important commercial centre of the Padan plain and is the seat of the Centro Intermodale Merci (CIM: Goods Intermodal Centre). Economically, it is affected by the proximity of Milan, and in fact many Milanese firms have offices in Novara.

The main economic products and services are:
agriculture: rice and maize (American English: corn)
metallurgical production
chemicals and petrochemicals
pharmaceuticals
food products
intermodal commerce and logistics
banking and insurance services
rice products exchange

The city of Novara is a member of the TOP-IX (Torino-Piemonte Exchange Point) internet exchange consortium, a consortium to create an Internet Exchange Point for northwestern Italy.

Companies based in Novara include the publishing company De Agostini.

Transport
The local public transport agency is the SUN.

Railways
The city is served by three railway stations:
 Vignale FS, a small station operated by the Ferrovie dello Stato (regional trains)
 Novara FS, the principal station of the Ferrovie dello Stato, Italy's national railway (regional, national and international trains).
 Novara Nord, the station operated by the LeNord railroad.  The new station in via Leonardo da Vinci opened in 2005 (regional and high-speed trains (only 2006) trains).

Motorways and main roads
Novara is linked to Turin and Milan by the A4 motorway (via the junctions Novara Ovest and Novara Est).  The A26 motorway crosses most of Novara province, but there is not a junction that links it directly with Novara. To reach Novara from the A26, one must exit at Vercelli Est, but one can also reach Novara by way of the A4, which crosses the A26 at a junction.  Novara is served by a system of dual-carriageway bypasses.  The oldest such bypass is the Tangenziale Est, directly linked with the motorway junction Novara Est. In 2003, road works were completed on the Tangenziale Sud.

The S11 trunk road from Milan and Magenta passes through Novara on its way to Vercelli and Turin. Trunk roads to the north and south also link Novara to the motorway network.

Sports
Novara Calcio is an association football club based in Novara.
There is a professional women's Serie A1 volleyball team:  AGIL Volley - Igor Novara Volley.
There were an important baseball team and very important Hockey team.

Government

The current mayor of Novara is Alessandro Canelli, elected in June 2016, representing a centre-right coalition.

Administrative subdivisions
Novara is divided into thirteen wards (circoscrizioni); several of these are formed of a number of quarters (quartieri), zones, and/or frazioni.

According to changes in local electoral laws, from June 2011 elections  they were stripped of their elective bodies (council and president), thus remaining as a simple internal partition of the Comune.

 Centro (Historic Centre)
 Nord est (North East)
Sant’Andrea (quartiere)
 San Rocco (quartiere)
 Nord (North)
Sant’Antonio (quartiere)
Vignale (frazione)
Veveri (frazione)
 Sant’Agabio
 Porta Mortara
 Sacro Cuore
 San Martino
 Santa Rita
 Ovest (West)
San Paolo (quartiere)
Zona Agogna (zone)
 Sud (South)
Cittadella (quartiere)
Rizzotaglia (quartiere)
Villagio Dalmazia (quartiere)
Torrion Quartara (frazione)
 Sud est (South East)
Bicocca (quartiere)
Olengo (frazione)
 Lumellogno
Lumellogno (frazione)
Casalgiate (frazione)
Pagliate (frazione)
Gionzana (frazione)
 Pernate

Notable people

Sergio Tacchini tennis player;
Gaspare Campari inventor;
Alessandro Antonelli architect;
Silvio Piola football player;
Giuseppe Ravizza inventor;
Gaudenzio Ferrari painter;
Isabella Leonarda (1620–1704), composer;
Tommaso Tommasina (1855-1935), painter;
Gianni Bettini (1860–1938), inventor;
Felice Casorati (1883–1963), painter;
Carlo Emanuele Buscaglia (1915–1944), aviator;
Vittorio Gregotti (1927–2020), architect;
Enzo Emanuele (born 1977), medical researcher;
Domenico Fioravanti (born 1977), swimmer;
Matias Masucci actor, director;
Roberto Passarin (1934–1982), Italian professional football player
Oscar Luigi Scalfaro (1918–2012), former Italian President of the republic;
Mario Miltone, professional footballer;
Marchesa Colombi, writer

Twin towns – sister cities

Novara is twinned with:
 Chalon-sur-Saône, France, since 1970
 Koblenz, Germany, since 1991

See also
 Battle of Novara (1513)
 Battle of Novara (1849)
 Battle of Bicocca
 Novara Calcio football club
 Province of Novara

References

Bibliography

External links
 Comune di Novara, city government website 
 Turismo Novara (tourist office) 

 
Castles in Italy
Cities and towns in Piedmont